Sayyid ul Sadaat Mir Sayyid Mahmud Saheb Agha ibn Mir Hasan Naqshbandi (died 1882) was a Sufi saint and direct descendant of the Islamic Prophet Muhammad. He was the brother of Sayyid Mir Jan and acted under him as Grand Master of the Naqshbandi Sufi Order.

Biography 
Before joining his brother Sayyid Mir Jan, he was a powerful statesman and Naqib al-Ashraf in the Emirate of Afghanistan as young leader in the young age of twenty years. Together with his brother Sayyid Mir Jan, he has revived the culture of Hazrat Ishaan, after it was closely forgotten, due to the tragic martyrdom of his relative Hazrat Ishaan V, Mir Sayyid Kamaludeen Shaheed.

Ancestry 
Sayyid Mahmud Agha is a Sayyid (a descendant of Muhammad through his daughter Fatimah and his cousin Ali ibn Abi Talib), both maternally and paternally.  Among his paternal ancestors are seven of the Twelve Imams, and among his maternal ancestors were eleven of the Twelve Imams, Sayyid Bahauddin Naqshband, Sayyid Alauddin Atar, and Khwaja Khawand Mahmud (also known as Hazrat Ishaan) also. After the Battle of Karbala, the Ahl al-Bayt went back to Medina. From there Musa al Kazim was forced to go to Iraq. The Musavis, i.e. the descendants of Musa al Kadhim, settled to Persia. One of them was Khwaja Sayyid Mir Ismail Muhammad Hakim, father of Khwaja Sayyid Mir Latif, an ancestor of Hazrat Sayyid Mahmud Agha. The descendants of Sayyid Mir Latif immigrated to Bokhara and after that to Kabul, where Sayyid Mahmud Agha was born. His paternal family were and are still known as Naqib al-Ashraf of the Sunnis of Greater Iran. Sayyid Mahmud Agha's maternal ancestors were Askari Sayyids, i.e. descendants of Imam Hasan al-Askari, through his son Sayyid Ali Akbar, whose existence was hidden, because of political conflicts. Sayyid Ali Akbar's descendants also migrated to Bokhara, where the prominent Sufi saint Bahauddin Naqshband, founder of the Naqshbandi Sufi Order, was born. A descendant of Bahauddin Naqshband after 7 generations was Hazrat Ishaan, whose descendants later immigrated to variable regions of South Asia, like Khorasan, today known as Afghanistan in order to spread the Ishaqiyya Naqshbandiyya branch's teachings.

Lineage 
 1 Muhammad
 2 Ali and Fatima Al Zahra
 3 Imam Hussain Shaheede Reza
 4 Imam Ali Zayn al-Abidin
 5 Imam Muhammad al Baqir
 6 Imam Ja'far al-Sadiq
 7 Imam Musa al Kazim
 8 Abu Qasim Sayyid Mir Hamza
 9 Sayyid Mir Qasim
 10 Sayyid Mir Ahmad
 11 Sayyid Mir Muhammad
 12 Sayyid Mir Ismail Muhammad Hakim
 13 Khwaja Sayyid Mir Latif
 14 Khwaja Sayyid Mir Muhammad
 15 Khwaja Sayyid Mir Kulal
 16 Khwaja Sayyid Mir Ahmad
 17 Khwaja Sayyid Mir Hashim
 18 Khwaja Sayyid Mir Mustaali
 19 Khwaja Sayyid Mir Dost Ali
 20 Khwaja Sayyid Mir Muhammad Latif
 21 Khwaja Sayyid Mir Abdullah
 22 Khwaja Sayyid Mir Muhammad Shamah
 23 Khwaja Sayyid Mir Latifullah
 24 Khwaja Sayyid Mir Ruhollah
 25 Khwaja Sayyid Mir Baitullah
 26 Khwaja Sayyid Mir Nimatullah
 27 Khwaja Sayyid Mir Azimullah
 28 Khwaja Sayyid Mir Muhammad Hasan
 29 Sayyid ul Sadat Hazrat Shah Saheb Khwaja Mir Sayyid Mahmud Saheb Agha

Nobility

Sayyid Mahmud Agha was a young leader of the Naqshbandi Sufi order and right hand of his older brother Sayyid Mir Jan. As heir of Hazrat Ishaan and his father Naqib Sayyid Mir Hasan the Naqib al-Ashraf of the Sunnis of Greater Iran, he was also considered an Alid Prince, with the heraldic title Mir.

Philanthropic work 
Sources mention occasions in which he helped his followers in spiritual, social and financial cases. One popular occasion was the rescue of children of his followers from criminal kidnappers, who mistreated them for child labour.

Cultivating the culture of Hazrat Ishaan 
Sayyid Mahmud Agha was well respected and welcomed by his followers, when he travelled to them in Amritsar, Lahore, Kashmir and also Istanbul. Their he held lectures and taught Islamic Law and Spirituality. He together with his brother preached the legacy of their ancestor Hazrat Ishaan. As representative of the family of Hazrat Ishaan, he also cultivated the culture of his ancestor Hazrat Ishaan and wrote poems that are until today widely known under the followers of Hazrat Ishaan. One special literature work of him is the modification of the anthem of the legacy of Hazrat Ishaan.

Modified Anthem 
The modified anthem is in Persian, the mother language of Hazrat Ishaan and his descendants:

رو در صف دوستان ما باش و مترس
Be on the side of our friends and have no fear

خاک راه آستان ما باش و مترس
Be dust on the way of our legacy and have no fear

گر جمله جهان قصد اوجود تو کند
Even when the whole world is standing against you

دل فارغ دار از آن ما باش و مترس
Have a pure heart and stay with us and have no fear

ما در کشانتان هستیم در کوه و دره
We are guarding you in mountains and valleys

انجا که شیر و پلنگ و هشدار گذرد
Where lions, tigers and hyenas are around

پیران قوی دارم و مردان سره
I have strong saints and high men by my side

هر کس که به ما کج نگرد جان نبره
Every one who looks crooked at us will bear no life

رو در صف دوستان ما باش و مترس
Be on the side of our friends and have no fear

خاک راه آستا ما باش و مترس
Be dust on the way of our legacy and have no fear

Veneration 
Sayyid Mahmud Agha was a very open-minded person, who attracted people of various religions. The members of major religious groups in Lahore ascribed to him divine powers and attributes, which eventually let him convert his Non-Muslim followers to Islam.

Legacy 
Sayyid Mahmud Agha Shah Saheb died in Lahore as a young man in his twenties and is buried on the left of the future grave of Sayyid Mir Jan. In his mausoleum in Begampura, Lahore. On the occasion of his death there was a violent clash between his followers of various religions, who attributed to him saintship of their own respective religion. 
His Muslim followers encompassed both Sunnis and Shiites, whereas his Hindu followers in Lahore even attributed to him the rank of the reincarnation of Krishna. Furthermore, he was considered a Guru by contemporary Sikhs in Lahore, although Sayyid Mahmud Agha was no Hindu or Sikh, staying to his values as a conservative Muslim.
Eventually his older brother Sayyid Mir Jan has mediated and calmed down the mob, making a conclusion to bury him in an Islamic manner in the Mausoleum of Hazrat Ishaan, converting the Non-Muslim followers peacefully and passionately to Islam. His death anniversary is commemorated with short prayers called Zikr. It is  known as the day, in which a Wali died in deep love.

His followers call him Nooron ala Noor or "the manifest of the light of Prophet Muhammad"

His brother Sayyid Mir Jan 
He is known for his unlimited love and loyalty to his older brother and master Sayyid Mir Jan. He reportedly resembled Muhammad and Ali.

Legacy 
In honor Hazrat Ishaan, Dakik Family also known as the House of Hazrat Ishaan are continuing his legacy. The Dakik Family are biologically related to Sayyid Mahmud Agha as he is the granduncle of the family´s matriarch Sayyida Rahima, that married with a Prince of the Afghan Royal Family, acting as UN Ambassador.

See also 
Abdul Qadir Jilani
Mir Sayyid Ali Hamadani
Ali Hujwiri
Sayyid Ali Akbar
Sayyid Badiuddin Madar
Bahauddin Naqshband
Moinuddin Chishti
Hazrat Ishaan
Ziyarat Naqshband Sahab
Moinuddin Hadi Naqshband
Sayyid Mir Jan
Sayyid Mir Fazlullah Agha
Sultan Masood Dakik

References 

Family of Muhammad
Hashemite people
Sufi religious leaders
Naqshbandi order
1800 births
1901 deaths
Sufi mystics
Sufi poets
Indian Sufi saints
Afghan people of Arab descent
People from Kabul